It Can't Be All Our Fault is a 2003 Italian comedy film directed by Carlo Verdone.

Plot 
In the study of a psychologist, the eight stars of the film are waiting for placement in the office. However the psychologist dies of a heart attack and so the eight patients should look for a new doctor. But in the end they decide to make a therapy group to better understand their problems.

Cast 
 Carlo Verdone: Galeazzo "Gegè" Tinacci
 Margherita Buy: Flavia
 Anita Caprioli: Chiara
 Antonio Catania: Ernesto
 Lucia Sardo: Gabriella 
 Sergio Graziani: father of Gegè
 Roberto Accornero: Massimo

References

External links

2003 films
Italian comedy films
Films directed by Carlo Verdone
2003 comedy films
2000s Italian-language films